Iridana is a genus of butterflies in the family Lycaenidae. The species of this genus are endemic to the Afrotropical realm.

The only known specimen of I. agneshorvathae was collected at light in Bia National Park in western Ghana from a dry semi-deciduous forest and is most probably a canopy species. It might or might not be endemic to the Ghana subregion of West Africa.

Species
Iridana agneshorvathae Collins, Larsen & Sáfián, 2008
Iridana bwamba Stempffer, 1964
Iridana euprepes (Druce. 1905)
Iridana exquisita (Grose-Smith, 1898)
Iridana gabunica Stempffer, 1964
Iridana ghanana Stempffer, 1964
Iridana hypocala Eltringham, 1929
Iridana incredibilis (Staudinger, 1891)
Iridana jacksoni Stempffer, 1964
Iridana katera Stempffer, 1964
Iridana marina Talbot, 1935
Iridana nigeriana Stempffer, 1964
Iridana obscura Stempffer, 1964
Iridana perdita (Kirby, 1890)
Iridana rougeoti Stempffer, 1964
Iridana tororo Stempffer, 1964
Iridana unyoro Stempffer, 1964

References

External links
"Iridana Aurivillius, 1921" at Markku Savela's Lepidoptera and Some Other Life Forms
Seitz, A. Die Gross-Schmetterlinge der Erde 13: Die Afrikanischen Tagfalter. Plate XIII 64

Poritiinae
Lycaenidae genera
Taxa named by Per Olof Christopher Aurivillius